Johannes Jacobus (Joghem) van Loghem (1914-2005), was a professor of internal medicine at the Wilhelmina Gasthuis in Amsterdam renowned for his work in blood group serology and immunohaematology.

References 

1914 births
2005 deaths
20th-century Dutch physicians
Dutch immunologists
Officers of the Order of Orange-Nassau
Scientists from Amsterdam
Academic staff of the University of Amsterdam